Deh Khosrow (also known as Dāvūd Rashīd-e Khosrow, Dāvūd Rash, Dāvūd Rashīd, and Shahīd Rajā’ī) is a village in Kuhdasht-e Jonubi Rural District, in the Central District of Kuhdasht County, Lorestan Province, Iran. At the 2006 census, its population was 104, in 22 families.

References 

Towns and villages in Kuhdasht County